The 1987 CONMEBOL Pre-Olympic Tournament began on 18 April 1987 and ended on 3 May 1987 and was the 8th CONMEBOL Pre-Olympic Tournament.

Brazil and Argentina qualified for the 1988 Summer Olympics.

Group stage

Group 1

Group 2

Final round

References 

CONMEBOL Pre-Olympic Tournament
Conmebol